The Kolkata Metro is a mass rapid transit urban railway network in Kolkata, India. It was the first underground railway to be built in India, with the first operations commencing in 24 October, 1984. As of January, 2023, there are  4 commercially operational depots Noapara, Tollygunge, New Garia and Central Park.

Depots

Operational

Under Construction

See also 

 Kolkata Metro
 List of Kolkata Metro stations
 List of proposed and under-construction Kolkata metro stations

References 

List
Kolkata metro